Simone Padoin (born 18 March 1984) is an Italian former professional footballer who played as a wingback or midfielder.

After starting out in the Atalanta youth side, he later also represented Vicenza, before returning to Atalanta to play for the senior side in 2007. He then transferred to Juventus in January 2012, where he remained until 2016, winning five consecutive Serie A titles with the club, among other trophies. In July 2016 he moved to Cagliari Calcio. He joined Ascoli in 2019.

Club career

Vicenza and Atalanta

A product of Atalanta's fruitful youth academy, Simone joined Vicenza from Atalanta in a co-ownership deal in 2003 which became full-ownership one year later.

At the beginning of the 2007–08 season, he returned to Atalanta for € 1.9 million  when the club bought back half of his registration rights from Vicenza (€1M cash plus Brivio). On 4 January 2008, Vicenza signed Zampagna (€1.9M) and Brivio (€0.75M) outright; with the remain 50% registration rights of Padoin was sold from Vicenza for €1.55 million. The overall transaction means Vicenza paid Atalanta €100,000 cash in net, plus Padoin, to acquire Brivio and Zampagna outright.

Padoin added three more years to his contract on 13 May 2009, which took his deal to June 2013.

After the end of the 2009–10 Serie A season, he was borrowed by Juventus for their US tour, along with four other players. He played a few games for Juventus in their post-season tour and then returned to Atalanta for their own preseason work.

Juventus
On 31 January 2012, he permanently moved to Juventus for a fee of €5 million in -year contract. On 17 March of the same year, he scored his first goal with Juventus in an away fixture against Fiorentina which ended in a 5–0 victory; he scored the 5th goal of the match.

On 22 December 2014, in the 2014 Supercoppa Italiana final against Napoli in Doha, Padoin came on as a substitute for Stephan Lichtsteiner after 79 minutes. In the resulting penalty shootout, which went to sudden death, he had the decisive spot-kick saved by Rafael, handing Napoli the victory.

On 8 November 2015, Padoin made his 200th Serie A appearance in a 3–1 away win over Empoli.

Cagliari
On 4 July 2016, Juventus confirmed that Padoin had been sold to newly promoted Cagliari for a fee of €600,000. He made his debut for the team in a 5–1 win against S.P.A.L. in the First Round Coppa Italia, and scored his first, and so far only goal for the club in a 2–1 home league win against Crotone.

Ascoli
On 2 September 2019, he signed a two-year contract with one-year extension option with Ascoli.

Managerial career 
On 22 July 2021, Padoin became a technical collaborator of Massimiliano Allegri's staff in Juventus.

Style of play
Padoin has been praised by his managers for his work-rate, consistency, tactical intelligence, and versatility, as he is capable of playing in several positions, and adapting himself to different formations. Although he usually plays anywhere in midfield, throughout his career he has also been deployed in defence, as a full-back, as a central defender, and as a wing-back. A box-to-box player, he has also functioned as a central midfielder, as a mezzala, defensive midfielder, as an offensive midfielder, and as a winger.

Career statistics

Club

Honours
Atalanta
Serie B: 2010–11

Juventus
Serie A: 2011–12, 2012–13, 2013–14, 2014–15, 2015–16
Supercoppa Italiana: 2012, 2013,  2015
Coppa Italia: 2014–15, 2015–16

References

External links

 Atalanta B.C. Official Player Profile
 Simone Padoin National Team Stats at FIGC.it
 Profile at TuttoCalciatori.net
 Intervista esclusiva a Simone Padoin at Footballnews24.it

Living people
1984 births
People from Gemona del Friuli
Italian footballers
Association football defenders
Association football midfielders
Association football utility players
Italy under-21 international footballers
Italy youth international footballers
Serie A players
Serie B players
L.R. Vicenza players
Atalanta B.C. players
Juventus F.C. players
Cagliari Calcio players
Ascoli Calcio 1898 F.C. players
Footballers from Friuli Venezia Giulia